OSP or Osp may refer to:

Places 
 Osp, a valley and a village in Slovenia

Biology 
 Outer surface proteins (Osp), expressed in the outer membrane of some gram-negative bacteria, particularly Borrelia burgdorferi

Organizations
 Oblate Sisters of Providence, a Roman Catholic women's religious institute
 Office of Special Plans, a U.S. intelligence unit (2002–2003)
 Onafhankelijke Socialistische Partij (Independent Socialist Party), a revolutionary socialist political party in the Netherlands
 Orchestra of St Paul's, a professional chamber orchestra resident at the Actors' Church, London
 Oregon Star Party, an annual event in the United States for observational astronomy
 Oregon State Police, an American law enforcement agency

Technology 
 Online service provider, a supplier of internet content
 Open Settlement Protocol, a standard for ISPs to exchange information on IP telephony
 Open Source Physics, a project to encourage open source code libraries for numerical simulation
 Open Specification Promise, a legal statement concerning use of Microsoft intellectual property
 Open Syllabus Project, an open-source syllabus database
 OpenShot, a free and open-source video editor for Windows, macOS, Linux, and ChromeOS
 Operating System Projects, an environment for teaching about computer systems
 Orbital Space Plane, a NASA concept to support the International Space Station
 Organic solderability preservative, a method for coating printed circuit boards
 Outside plant, the telecommunications or electrical cabling between supplier and customer

Other 
 Ovince St. Preux, an American martial artist known as OSP